"Once Bitten, Twice Shy" is a 1975 song written and recorded by Ian Hunter, from his debut solo album Ian Hunter, which reached No. 14 in the UK Singles Chart. 

The song was included in the 2017 feature-length biographical documentary, and compilation soundtrack, entitled Beside Bowie: the Mick Ronson Story.

Great White cover

"Once Bitten, Twice Shy" was covered in 1989 by the American glam metal group Great White on their fourth album ...Twice Shy.  This version was also released as a single, which charted at No. 5 on the Billboard Hot 100, at No. 6 on the Mainstream Rock Tracks chart and again in the UK.

This version's video was placed on New York Times list of the 15 Essential Hair-Metal Videos.

Critical reception
Billboard's reviewer came to conclusion that success of LP in its chart will be a "strong support" to single and "should place this boogieing rocker on a large number of playlists."

Charts

Certifications

Track listings

Ian Hunter 1975 single
"Once Bitten, Twice Shy" – 3:52
"3,000 Miles from Here" – 2:48

Great White 1989 single
"Once Bitten, Twice Shy" – 5:20
"Slow Ride" – 3:53
"Wasted Rock Ranger" (Cassette only)

References

External links

1975 songs
1975 singles
1989 singles
Capitol Records singles
Columbia Records singles
Great White songs
Ian Hunter (singer) songs
Songs written by Ian Hunter (singer)
Sony Music singles
Warner Records singles